Star Wars: Lost Stars is a 2015 young adult science fiction novel by Claudia Gray set in the Star Wars universe. The book is set before, during, and after the events of Star Wars, The Empire Strikes Back and Return of the Jedi, in which the Galactic Empire has tightened its stranglehold on systems in the Outer Rim while the Rebel Alliance also grows in strength. 

The novel depicts the story of two childhood friends, Ciena Ree and Thane Kyrell, who end up on opposite sides of the conflict: Thane defects to the Rebel Alliance, while Ciena stays in the Galactic Empire. While the two struggle to reconcile their loyalty to the organizations with their friendship with each other, a romance blossoms between the two.

Plot
Aristocratic Thane Kyrell and villager Ciena Ree reside on the Outer Rim planet of Jelucan, where the two bond over their shared love of flying and interest in enrolling at the Imperial Academy to become TIE fighter pilots. While enrolled at the Imperial Academy on Coruscant, they top their classes, often competing with each other for first in their class. They remain good friends until Thane's laser cannon project is sabotaged by the Academy itself, who frame Ciena for doing so. As punishment, both fail the assignment and lose the top spots of the class. When Thane proposes the theory that the Academy itself had framed Ciena for sabotaging Thane's project, Ciena accuses him of being disloyal to the Empire.

Thane and Ciena's relationship remains sabotaged until their graduation from the Imperial Academy, where they reconcile during the graduation ceremony, dancing together.

After their graduation, Ciena is assigned to the Devastator, Darth Vader's Star Destroyer, while Thane is assigned to the Death Star as a TIE pilot. Both Thane and Ciena witness Alderaan's destruction by the Death Star. Thane ultimately survives the Death Star's destruction, having been sent away on a search mission on Dantooine.

After the destruction of the Death Star, Ciena is reunited with Thane on her Star Destroyer. However, later on, Thane deserts his service, becoming disillusioned with the Empire after seeing the atrocities committed by it. After deserting the Empire, Thane meets with Ciena on Jelucan, where she attempts to convince him to return to the Empire, to no avail. After professing their feelings for each other, they make love before bidding each other farewell.

Wedge Antillies recruits Thane to the Rebel Alliance, where he becomes an X-wing fighter pilot. After the Battle of Hoth, Ciena recognizes Thane's flying style from battle footage and realizes that Thane had joined the Rebellion. This causes a dilemma within Ciena, who still has feelings for Thane but is loyal to the Galactic Empire.

Later on, Ciena's mother on Jelucan is charged with embezzlement. Ciena takes leave to support her mother alongside her father. No one comes to support them, as their tradition expected, except, to her surprise, Thane. The two decide to go flying together like they used to, realizing that almost nothing had changed between them except fighting for opposite sides. After an argument, Ciena and Thane make love a second time, though Thane fails to recruit Ciena to the rebellion. In the trial, Ciena's mother is found guilty and sentenced to hard labor, upsetting Ciena. The two part ways, believing it will be one of the last times they will meet. 

However, Thane and his squadron encounter Ciena and her team when they are sent to gather intelligence. Ciena blocks the other TIE fighters' line of fire while pretending to pursue him, allowing Thane to escape.

After the destruction of the Second Death Star, Ciena is badly injured and has to take long medical leave. When she is back on duty, she is promoted to Captain and is assigned a Star Destroyer to command. During the Battle of Jakku, Thane's team is tasked with infiltrating and capturing the Star Destroyer. When Ciena realizes that the ship has been infiltrated, she orders her crew to abandon ship while intending to collide the ship into Jakku, making sure that the ship doesn't fall to the New Republic's hands. However, before she can follow through, Thane confronts Ciena on the ship's bridge. The two have an intense fight, though Thane emerges victorious and saves both of their lives, escaping in an escape pod.

In the end, Ciena is held as a prisoner-of-war. When Thane visits her, he assures her that she will be released soon, though Ciena still affirms her loyalty to the Empire.

Release
The novel is released in conjunction with Star Wars: Aftermath on September 4, 2015, as a part of the Journey to Star Wars: The Force Awakens publishing initiative, in preparation for the December 18, 2015 release of the seventh installment in the film saga, Star Wars: The Force Awakens.

The Battle of Jakku, a battle that is first described in the last few chapters of the novel, can be experienced in the Star Wars Battlefront reboot video game, as free downloadable content that is released on December 8, 2015.

On May 4, 2017, LINE Corporation released an online manga adaptation of the novel exclusively in Japan. Yen Press announced during their Anime NYC panel that they licensed the manga for a North American release.

Reception
Sean Keane of NY Daily News wrote "'Lost Stars may be marketed as a Young Adult novel, but Gray crafts a well written, enthralling narrative that will appeal to Star Wars fans of all ages."

Megan Crouse of Den of Geek wrote "Claudia Gray’s Star Wars book Lost Stars has been a hit among fans so far. Originally described as Romeo and Juliet meets Star Wars, it explores the Empire and Rebellion in-depth through the eyes of two young adventurers, Thane and Ciena."

References

External links
 
 Lost Stars at Disney Publishing Worldwide

2015 American novels
2015 science fiction novels
American young adult novels
American romance novels
Lost Stars
Novels by Claudia Gray
Yen Press titles